Thomas County Central High School is a high school in Thomasville, Georgia, United States.

References

External links

Thomas County Schools

Public high schools in Georgia (U.S. state)
Schools in Thomas County, Georgia